The National Basketball League (NBL) presents 7 annual awards to recognize its teams, players, and coaches for their accomplishments. This does not include the NBL championship trophy, which is given to the winning team of the NBL Grand Final.

Team trophies

Honours

Individual awards

See also

List of WNBL awards
NBL1 Awards
List of National Basketball League (New Zealand) awards

References

awards